Elaphrus hypocrita is a species of ground beetle in the subfamily Elaphrinae. It was described by Semenov in 1926.

References

Elaphrinae
Beetles described in 1926